The Racket Club Open is a tennis tournament held in Buenos Aires, Argentina since 2016. The event is part of the ATP Challenger Tour and is played on outdoor clay courts.

Past finals

Singles

Doubles

References

External links 

 
ATP Challenger Tour
Clay court tennis tournaments
Tennis tournaments in Argentina